Jim Renouf (29 March 1940 – 26 July 1977) was an Australian rules footballer who played with Fitzroy in the Victorian Football League (VFL). 

After his death in a car accident in 1977, Frankston and Port Melbourne played for the Jim Renouf Memorial Trophy.

Notes

External links 		
		
		
		
		
1977 deaths
1940 births		
Australian rules footballers from Victoria (Australia)		
Fitzroy Football Club players
Port Melbourne Football Club players
Frankston Football Club players
Road incident deaths in Australia